Jazmurian may refer to:
Jazmurian District
Jazmurian Rural District